Patrick Farrelly (1770January 12, 1826) was a member of the U.S. House of Representatives from Pennsylvania.

Biography
Patrick Farrelly (father of John Wilson Farrelly) was born in the Kingdom of Ireland, a member of the Farrelly family. He immigrated to the United States in 1798.  He studied law, was admitted to the bar July 11, 1803, and commenced practice in Meadville, Pennsylvania.  He was a member of the Pennsylvania House of Representatives in 1811 and 1812.  He served in the War of 1812 as a major of militia.

He was elected a member of the American Antiquarian Society in 1820.

Farrelly was elected as a Republican to the Seventeenth Congress, and was reelected as a Jackson Republican to the Eighteenth Congress and as a Jacksonian candidate to the Nineteenth Congress and served until his death in Meadville in 1826.  Interment in Greendale Cemetery.

See also
List of United States Congress members who died in office (1790–1899)

References

Sources

The Political Graveyard

1770 births
1826 deaths
Members of the Pennsylvania House of Representatives
American militiamen in the War of 1812
Pennsylvania lawyers
American people of Irish descent
Democratic-Republican Party members of the United States House of Representatives from Pennsylvania
Jacksonian members of the United States House of Representatives from Pennsylvania
19th-century American politicians
Members of the American Antiquarian Society
American militia officers
Burials at Greendale Cemetery